The Galleria, located at One Galleria Boulevard in Metairie, Louisiana, is a 21-story, -tall skyscraper designed by architect HKS, Inc.  The Galleria was completed in 1986 and is the second tallest building in Jefferson Parish.  The tower's primary use is as office space, along with the studios of Nexstar Media Group's two television stations for the New Orleans market, ABC affiliate WGNO and CW affiliate WNOL-TV.  Six towers of roughly equal height were originally planned; this tower is the only one that was built.

Location
One Galleria BoulevardMetairie, LA 70001

See also
 List of tallest buildings in New Orleans
 List of tallest buildings in Metairie

External links 
 The Galleria on Emporis.com

Skyscraper office buildings in Metairie, Louisiana
Office buildings completed in 1986